Aqtam (Aqtam)  is a village in the Almaty Region of south-eastern Kazakhstan.

External links
Tageo.com

Populated places in Almaty Region